ProbLog is a probabilistic logic programming that extends Prolog with probabilities. It minimally extends Prolog by adding the notion of a probabilistic fact, which combines the idea of logic atoms and random variables. Similarly to Prolog, ProbLog can query an atom. While Prolog returns the truth value of the queried atom, ProbLog returns the probability of it being true.

Semantics 
A probabilistic fact is a pair  with  an atom and  the probability of  being true. A rule is defined by an atom , called the head, and a finite set of  literals , called the body.
ProbLog programs consist of a set of probabilistic facts  and a set of rules . Using the distribution semantics, a probability distribution is defined over the two-valued well-founded models of the atoms in the program. The probability of a model is defined as  where the product runs over all the literals in the model . For a query atom  the distribution semantics defines a probability for the query

in which the sum runs over all the models where  is true.

ProbLog supports multiple tasks:
Probabilistic inference: calculate 
Most probable explanation: calculate the most probable model probability 
Sampling: generate samples of 
Learning from interpretations: learn the probabilities of ProbLog programs from data

Example 

ProbLog can for example be used to calculate the probability of getting wet given the probabilities for rain and the probabilities that someone brings an umbrella as follows:
0.4 :: rain(weekday).
0.9 :: rain(weekend).
0.8 :: umbrella_if_rainy(Day).
0.2 :: umbrella_if_dry(Day).

umbrella(Day) :- rain(Day), umbrella_if_rain(Day).
umbrella(Day) :- \+rain(Day), umbrella_if_dry(Day).
wet(Day) :- rain(Day), \+umbrella(Day).

query(\+wet(weekend)).

The last rule before the query states that someone gets wet if it rains and no umbrella was brought. When ProbLog is asked to solve the "probabilistic inference" task, the query asks for the probability to stay dry on a weekend day. When solving the "most probable explanation" task, ProbLog will return the most likely reason for staying dry, i.e. because it is not raining or because the person has an umbrella.

Implementations 
The ProbLog language has been implemented as a YAP Prolog library (ProbLog 1). and as a stand-alone Python framework (ProbLog 2)
The source code of ProbLog 2 is licensed under  Apache License, Version 2.0 and available on GitHub.

ProbLog variants 
ProbLog has been extended or used as inspiration for several different variants, including:
 DeepProbLog extends ProbLog by allowing the probability to be parametrized by a neural network.
 DTProblog extends ProbLog with decision theory. The utility of a strategy is defined as the expected reward for its execution in the presence of probabilistic effects.
 DC-ProbLog extends ProbLog with distributional facts, meaning that instead of probabilities, a logic atom has a corresponding continuous probability distribution instead.
 aProbLog extends ProbLog by allowing any semiring instead of just probabilities.
 ProbFOIL: given a set of ProbLog facts as a probabilistic relational database, ProbFOIL finds a set of probabilistic rules to predict the facts of one relation based on all other relations.

Related systems 
 PRISM: Programming in statistical modeling
 ICL: Independent Choice Logic
 CP-Logic: Language of causal probabilistic events
 PITA: Probabilistic Inference with Tabling and Answer subsumption
 Distributional clauses: A probabilistic logic language for hybrid relational domains

Further reading 
 ProbLog homepage 
 ProbLog docs 
 ProbLog repository

References 

Probabilistic software
Programming paradigms
Nondeterministic programming languages
Computational statistics
Python (programming language) scientific libraries